para-Quaterphenyl, or p-quaterphenyl, is a chemical compound consisting of a straight chain of four phenyl groups connected in the para position. It can be considered as next in the series of benzene, biphenyl, para-terphenyl. It is an aromatic hydrocarbon and a chromophore.

One possible use is in scintillation counters where it is dissolved in toluene and glows when subject to beta rays.

References

Phenyl compounds